L'Escampleru is one of six parishes (administrative divisions) in Les Regueres, a municipality within the province and autonomous community of Asturias, in northern Spain.

The population is 616 (INE 2011).

Villages
 L'Escampleru
 Gallegos
 Pumeda
 Quexu
 Rañeces
 San Pedru Nora
 Taoces
 Tamargu
 Valsera

References 

Parishes in Las Regueras